Rho guanine nucleotide exchange factor 1 is a protein that in humans is encoded by the ARHGEF1 gene. This protein is also called RhoGEF1 or p115-RhoGEF.

Function 
Rho guanine nucleotide exchange factor 1 is guanine nucleotide exchange factor (GEF) for the RhoA small GTPase protein. Rho is a small GTPase protein that is inactive when bound to the guanine nucleotide GDP. But when acted on by Rho GEF proteins such as RhoGEF1, this GDP is released and replaced by GTP, leading to the active state of Rho. In this active, GTP-bound conformation, Rho can bind to and activate specific effector proteins and enzymes to regulate cellular functions. In particular, active Rho is a major regulator of the cell actin cytoskeleton.

RhoGEF1 is a member of a group of four RhoGEF proteins known to be activated by G protein coupled receptors coupled to the  G12 and G13 heterotrimeric G proteins. The others are ARHGEF11 (also known as PDZ-RhoGEF), ARHGEF12 (also known as LARG) and AKAP13 (also known as ARHGEF13 and Lbc).  GPCR-regulated RhoGEF1 (and these related GEF proteins) acts as an effector for G12 and G13 G proteins. In addition to being activated by G12 or G13 G proteins, three of these four RhoGEF proteins (ARHGEF1/11/12) also function as RGS family GTPase-activating proteins (GAPs) to increase the rate of GTP hydrolysis of G12/G13 alpha proteins (which are themselves GTPase proteins). This action increases the rate of G protein deactivation, limiting the time during which these RhoGEFs activate Rho.

Multiple alternatively spliced transcript variants have been identified for this gene, but the full-length nature and function of some variants has not been defined.

Interactions 
ARHGEF1 has been shown to interact with:
 CD44 
 GNA12
 GNA13
 P110α

See also 
 Second messenger system
 G protein-coupled receptor
 Heterotrimeric G protein
 Small GTPases
 Rho family of GTPases

References

External links

Further reading